Maximiliano Caire (born July 12, 1988 in Villa Elisa, Argentina) is an Argentine footballer currently playing for Oriente Petrolero of the Bolivian Primera División. Although mainly a right full back, Caire can play in either position of the field, both as a full back or as a winger.

Club career
Caire debuted professionally for Almagro in 2007. In 2008, he was loaned out to Gimnàstic of the Spanish Segunda División B.

In 2009, the full back joined Colón in the Argentine Primera División, debuting in a 0–1 home defeat to Vélez Sarsfield for the first fixture of the 2009 Apertura. His best year in Colón was 2012, in which he played as a regular starter during both the 2012 Clausura and 2012 Inicial tournaments, totaling 34 games and one goal. Caire left Colón after the team's relegation at the end of the 2013–14 Argentine Primera División season.

The Argentine full back had a sixth-month spell playing for Patronato in the Primera B Nacional. Later, he joined recently promoted Sarmiento in the Primera División, helping the team remain in the first division.

For the 2016 Argentine Primera División, Caire joined Vélez Sarsfield on a free transfer.

International career
In 2012, Caire was called by coach Alejandro Sabella for an Argentina national team formed with local league players, to play the Superclásico de las Américas. However, he did not enter the field during the match.

References

External links
 Profile at Vélez Sarsfield's official website 
 
 

1988 births
Living people
Argentine footballers
Argentine expatriate footballers
Association football defenders
Club Atlético Colón footballers
Club Atlético Patronato footballers
Club Atlético Sarmiento footballers
Club Atlético Vélez Sarsfield footballers
Club Atlético Tigre footballers
Defensa y Justicia footballers
Club de Gimnasia y Esgrima La Plata footballers
Oriente Petrolero players
Argentine Primera División players
Primera Nacional players
Bolivian Primera División players
Argentine expatriate sportspeople in Bolivia
Expatriate footballers in Bolivia
Sportspeople from Entre Ríos Province